Microsoft Office Project Portfolio Server is a discontinued project portfolio management application from Microsoft. It was part of its Enterprise Project Management suite which includes Microsoft Office Project Server.

Versions for Windows 
 2007 – Project Portfolio Server 2007
 2006 – Project Portfolio Server 2006
 Previous Years – UMT Portfolio Manager

Description 

Microsoft Office Project Portfolio Server 2007 allows creation of a project portfolio, including workflows, hosted centrally, so that the information is available throughout the enterprise, even from a browser. It also aids in centralized data aggregation regarding the project planning and execution, and in visualizing and analyzing the data to optimize the project plan. It can also support multiple portfolios per project, to track different aspects of it. It also includes reporting tools to create consolidated reports out of the project data.

Office Project PortfolioServer is being rolled up into Project Server 2010 with 64 bit requirements all the way around for the 2010 family

See also 
Microsoft Office Project Server
Microsoft Project
Microsoft Office
Microsoft Servers

Microsoft Office servers
Project management software